San Jose, officially the Municipality of San Jose, is a 4th class municipality in the province of Camarines Sur, Philippines. According to the 2020 census, it has a population of 43,973 people.

History
The history of the town of San Jose dates back to 1801 when this town was a barrio of Lagonoy under the name Danlog. The old Parish Priest of Lagonoy, Fr. Salvador Mendoza, decided to build a church in a place called "Cabayawasnan" because of the presence of so many guava trees in the area. Unfortunately, the place was owned by Laurenciano Barcillano who refused to donate the land to the Church. However, through circumstances beyond his control, ownership was passed to the Church.

The construction of the church began in 1818 and there were only around thirty houses around the area. So, the priest sought the help of the people of Lagonoy. It was a cooperative effort of the people of Lagonoy who worked on the northern part and the people of Danlog on the southern part. Most of the materials and labor were either free or as payment for weddings and baptism.

In 1813, the town of San Jose was officially established under the name "Patrocinio" derived from the word "Patron", meaning model. Then it was changed to Patrocinio de San Jose in honor of its Patron Saint, San Jose de Patriarca. Later in 1883, it was shortened to "San Jose" which is now the official name. Its founders were Fr. Salvador Mendoza, then the Parish Priest of El Pueblo de Lagonoy and Don Macario Agustin, the first Capitan Municipal of the town.

After the founding of the town, progress and development became eminent and this could be attributed to the cooperative efforts of the church and the state. In 1887, the foundations of the municipal building were laid when Venancio Obias was the Captain Municipal. His successors continued the work but the structure was completely destroyed by a very strong typhoon called "Bagyong Ogis", so named because the back of the trees were shredded of and trunks turned white in 1898. A big house owned by Capitan Gregorio Patrocinio was made the temporary "tribunal."

When the people of Naga decided to take up arms against the Spaniards, Elias Angeles, then the leading "Guard Civil" of Naga convinced the people of San Jose to join the revolutionary movement. Ariston Prila, a "cabeza de barangay" from barangay Kinalansan heeded the call.

In the early part of 1903, when the Americans reached the town, there were a handful of revolutionaries led by Jose Valencia and Nicomedes Mata but they fled when they realized that their resistance was futile. The American Government was easily established and continued its pacification campaign while pursuing its goal of effecting changes in various aspects of the lives of the people.

During the Japanese occupation, Japanese soldiers reached the town in the latest of 1942. Most of the people had evacuated to the far-flung barangays and up to the mountains of Goa and Lagonoy while some joined the guerrilla movement. Filipino-Japanese government continued with an appointed Mayor. Filipino volunteers manned the defense of the town hall which served as garrison while the Japanese Imperial Forces had Goa for its headquarters. Schools were ordered opened by the authorities to allay fears and to give confidence of the people.

With the end of the Pacific War and the celebration of Independence in 1946, the people slowly rehabilitated their lives from the ravages of the war and returned to their usual milieu with renewed vigor.

May 19 marks the annual celebration of the feast day of San Jose, the town's patron saint.

Geography
San Jose has a total land area of 4,702.8146 hectares and is bounded in north by Lagonoy, south by Tigaon, east by Lagonoy Gulf, and west by Goa. The whole town is roughly 0.27% of the region's 1.76 million hectares; 0.89% of the total land area of Camarines Sur with an area of 526.680 square kilometers; and 2.26% of the total land area of the 4th Congressional District of Camarines Sur with an area of 207,596.71 hectares.

Barangays

San Jose is politically subdivided into 29 barangays.

Climate

The municipality belongs to Type II Climate characterized by the absence of a dry season and very pronounced maximum rainfall from November to December. It is during these months that the Northeast monsoon season occurs and the tropical cyclones contribute to the increased rainfall in the area. In January and February, the effect of these air masses on rainfall is considerably radical. In addition to the north-east monsoon during the months of February and March, the trail winds traveling from East to West do not give significant increase of rainfall. Likely, the month of May is the transition period between the monsoon that is prevalent from June to September. During the south-west monsoon season, the linear system called the Intertropical Convergence Zone (ITZ), brings the largest amount of rainfall to the area. In October, which is the transitive period between the south-west and north-east monsoons, the tropical cyclone brings considerable amount of rain.

The rainfall distribution in the municipality is greatly influenced by the air streams, tropical cyclones, the Intertropical Convergence Zone, shorelines, easterly waves and other rainfall-causing weather patterns. The rainfall season occurs from June to December with high rainfall intensity of 285.06mm to 474.22m and less rainfall intensity of 245.30mm to 224.06m from January to the month May which at the same time is the onset of effective rainfall with 75% probability and it would terminate in February of the following year which consequently during this period the mountainous areas receive higher intensity of rainfall. But the trend of monthly rainfall is unimodal (having one peak) and the maximum rain period is from October to December. On the other hand, the monthly average rainfall varies from 125.86mm to 594.56mm with a mean annual rainfall of 298.54mm.

The winds are influenced by the monsoon and the Pacific Trade System with Northeast direction that occurs in November to February; Easterly winds during the months of March, April, May and October; Southwest winds in June to August; and Westerly winds in September.

The maximum temperature during the month of January reaches about 27.9°C while 31.8 °C in November. The minimum temperature from December to June reaches about 20.6 °C to 24.5 °C; and the average monthly temperature is recorded at 25.0 °C in January to 27.9 °C in June.

Relative humidity is indicative of the amount of water vapor present in the atmosphere. Humidity in the Philippines as in the municipality of San Jose is high because of the warm moist air streams flowing over the archipelago, the surrounding seas, rich vegetation and abundant rainfall. The lowest average relative humidity occurs in May with 85.9%; highest in February with 93.4%; and the annual average humidity is 90% which is higher than the regional and national average of 82%.

Typhoon and storm surges

The tropical cyclone is a climatic control that contributes largely to the rainfall from June to December. It was shown to usually cause maximum values of rainfall and winds as exemplified by the highest wind speed of 77 miles per second as recorded in Virac, Catanduanes areas during the height of Typhoon Sening in 1970.

The tropical cyclones are internationally classified with these depending on their maximum wind speed or peak wind velocities (V) as follows:
 Tropical Depression, V<33 knots (63 km/h)
 Tropical Storm, 33 knots < V < 47 k (87 km/h)
 Tropical Storm, 47 knots < u < 63 knots (116 km/h)
 Typhoon, u > 63 knots (116 km/h)

The cyclones affecting the Philippine islands originate from the Pacific Ocean East of the Islands between latitude 8 degrees North, 10 degrees South, traveling on a Westerly or Northwesterly course over the country. It has the highest sustained wind velocity of 6 knots in November to April and lowest sustained wind velocity of 4 knots in September. Note that the average cyclone that passes over mainland Bicol which include San Jose town is 3 cyclones for every 2 years.

Topography
The terrain of the municipality is characterized as level to gently rolling and sloping. About 91.96% is characterized as having a generally flat terrain with a slope 0-3% which is described to be level to nearly level. It practically covers the entire land area of the town except barangay Adiangao which is located along the mountain range of Caramoan Peninsula which has an undulating to rolling terrain with 8.04% portions of steep slopes.

The elevation of the municipality is roughly 92.55% low to very low with a mean elevation from 0–100 meters above sea level. Hence, low elevation is about 5.72% ranging from 100 to 300 meters above sea level as well as 1.73% with moderately high elevation ranging from 300 to 500 meters above sea level.

Geology
The major part of the municipal area is composed of Alluvium River Terraces which is particularly described as fluvicatile lacustrine alluvium composed of unsorted loosely consolidated pebbles, gravel, silt, coral debris and clay that can be found in flooded plains, riverbanks, sand bars, beaches, and tidal flats. It is notable that river terraces along the Lagonoy River and its tributaries which include also the Rangas River that practically originating from the foot of the Mount Isarog account for about 90.69% or 4,264.9826 hectares of the total land area of the municipality while the rest is of igneous and metamorphic rock origin of which volcanoclast alluvial fans cover about 0.19% or 8.94 hectares. These are specifically found in barangays Catalotoan and Salogon. Note that volcanoclast is a thick and extensive pyroclastic material consists of ashes, cinder lapili, tuff agromerate and volcanic debris while alluvial fans consists only of worked pyroclastics.

Source: Municipal Comprehensive Landuse Plan & Zoning Ordinance (2000-2010)

On the other hand, barangay Adiangao is composed of igneous and metamorphic rocks classified as Basement Complex. It is characterized as highly fractured and folded complex consisting of quartzite, quartzatedspathit and mica schists that cover roughly 5.26% or 247.37 hectares. Meanwhile, the lower part of the place is composed of sedimentary rocks known as crystalline limestone which covers about 3.86% or 181.53 hectares. Crystalline limestone is an extensive transgressive rectal carbonated facies including wall preserved bushes of corals, megafossils and algae structure, detritae to fuffacious limestone showing well developed karst landforms or formation that can be found prevalent in the Caramoan Peninsula.

Landforms
The many landforms found in the municipality have been the natural production of the different geographical pressures of the different structural land forms such as alluvial lowland, alluvial fans, sedimentary plateau or masses of residual slopes and thick sedimentary landscapes. Most of its territorial areas are best characterized by broad alluvial plans described as level to nearly level, and moderately well-drained terraces. The level to undulating plains are the product of paludal environment or deltaic plains which are usually being flooded during slight and heavy downpours.

On the other hand, Barangay Adiangao is characterized by Shale/Sandstone Hills (SSH) which is described to be undulating to rolling, slightly to moderately dissected, and moistly top-rounded hills, both are low and high relief. Likewise, steep slopes are dissected closely with each other particularly those with greater than 18o inclinations. Meanwhile, V-shaped valleys are noted to have been composed and dominated by sandstone. Likewise, landforms in barangays Dolo, Sabang, part of Minoro, Manzana and Tagas are noted to be flat with very poorly drained terrains and oftentimes affected by floods caused by high tides. The coastal plains are most commonly swarmed with mangroves, nipa plants, break rides, swales and tidal flats.

Major Types of Land Management Units
The municipality is composed of 5 major types of Land Management Units (LMUs) which are classified into 2 forms, namely: Warm Lowland and Warm Cool Hillyland. They are enumerated and explained below.

Warm Lowland:
 Tidal Flats (LMU 02) is very deep, fine loamy dark grayish brown but sometimes coarse loamy grayish soil, medium acid to mildly alkaline reaction, low available P and CaMg but adequate with O.M., constant extractable KBSP and CEC; generally moderate fertility level, very low infiltration and moderate to slow permeability rate, submerged and very poorly drained.
 Beach Ridges and Swales (LMU 03) is shallow to moderately deep, very dark brown, coarse, and loamy underlain by sandy skeletal substratum; slightly acid to mutual moderate CaMg and CEC; available highly extractable K acid; BSP generally moderate fertility level; rapid to very rapid infiltration and rapid to moderate rapid permeability rate, and excessively drained.
 Estuarin Plain (LMU 04) is deep to very deep clay, predominantly very dark brown, yellowish brown, coarse, loamy underlain by sandy skeletal substratum; medium acid to neutral soil reaction; moderate exchangeable K, high O.M. content, available P, BSP and CEC; generally high fertility level; slow to very slow infiltration and rapid to moderately rapid permeability rate, and moderately well to poorly drained.
 Broad Plain (LMU 09) is moderately deep and sometimes shallow predominantly brown fine, loamy and sometimes coarse, loamy sub-soil underlain by coarse loamy skeletal stratum; strong acid to slightly acid, moderately available P, extractable K and Ca/Mg; adequate O.M. content CEC and BSP, moderate general fertility level; very slow to very rapid permeability rate, poorly to well drained, none to moderate flooding.

Warm Cool Hillyland:
 Shale/Sandstones Hills (LMU 70) is moderately shallow to very deep, predominantly dark, yellowish brown, and strong fine loamy and sometimes clayey subsoil underlain by skeletal substratum; medium soil to mildly alkaline reaction, low O.M. content and available P, high extractable K, Ca/Mg, BS and CEC generally moderate fertility level, slow to moderate permeability, moderate to well drained.

Soil classifications
The soil map reveals that the municipality is composed of 9 soil types, namely:
 Dolo Sandy clay loam and sandy loam
 Minoro Loam
 Venagre Clay loam and sandy loam
 Huyon-huyon Sandy loam
 Kinalansan Silty clay loam and Clay
 Magsaysay Sandy Loam
 San Miguel Silty Loam
 Porous rocks & clay load
 Sandy soil

It is also noted that the soil composition of the low-lying areas is rich loamy characterized as broad alluvial plains. However, the inherent soil fertility is generally moderate because of the moderate levels of calcium and magnesium contents that would be adequate for normal growth of crops. Meanwhile, the solids of the coastal plains are generally deep to poorly drained while beach ridges are shallow, coarse and loamy. These areas are noted to be moderately fertile due to low organic matter content; while some areas are poorly drained and prone to tidal floods usually occurring in barangays Sabang, Dolo, and Kinalansan.

On the other hand, soils that came from shales and sandstones can be found in barangay Adiangao. These are noted to be moderately shallow to moderately deep, fine loamy to clayey. Generally, it is high in fertility brought about by adequate levels of soil reaction, organic matter content, and permeability. However, soil limitations may include heavy texture, erosion hazard, surface stoniness as well as the presence of rock outcrops and shallow soils.

Soil Erosion and Landslide Susceptibility
The lands that are prone to erosion account for about 8.04% of the total land area and they have slopes ranging from 30%-50%. However, the erosion map of the municipality revealed that only 8.49% of the total land area are observed to be slightly eroded while no apparent erosion occurred in the rest of the territory.

Source: MPT Estimates

Flooding hazard
It has been noted that most of the municipal area or 92.14% is free from the hazards of flooding. However, there is a slight seasonal flooding or about 1.67% that usually occur in barangay Minoro and in the northern part of Dolo which covers about 78.54 hectares. The flood reaches a depth of less than 0.5 to 1.0 meter after heavy downpour. It would usually recede within 12 hours to a maximum of one day. Likewise, seasonal flooding is moderately experienced in some portions of barangays Dolo, Manzana, Kinalansan, Telegrafo and Calalahan with a depth of about 0.75 to 1.50 meters which would usually recedes within a few days only.

Source: Municipal Comprehensive Landuse Plan & Zoning Ordinance (2000-2010)

Rivers and creeks
There are a number of creeks and rivers that crisscross the municipality and all draining towards Lagonoy Gulf. These bodies of water are being feed by spring sources from Mt. Isarog. These rivers and creeks are most frequently being utilized not only for irrigation purposes of existing paddies but also for the day to day human activities such as bathing and washing.

Marine ecosystem
The municipality has a total length of shoreline along Lagonoy Gulf of 11.30 km. which is about 3.15% of the 358.70 km. of shoreline found within the 4th District of Camarines Sur. The fine beach sand in the area makes it suitable for natural harbors as well as refuge for ships and motorbancas during the peak of weather disturbances. Moreover, a variety of marine life and species are notably abounding in the municipal waters that provided a rich source of livelihood among coastal families. At present, there are two separate municipal ports, one located in barangay Sabang and the San Jose Fishing Port in Sitio Talisay, of barangay Dolo. They most frequently served as docking points for both inter-island passenger motorbancas and fishing vessels operating in Lagonoy Gulf.

Land classification
The entire land area of San Jose with 4,702.8146 hectares is classified as alienable and disposable. The existing land use and vegetation is composed of 62.04% for Paddy rice irrigated with 90-100% dominant land use; 26.48% for Coconuts; 7.33% for Build-up areas; 2.54% for Mangrove-tree type; and 1.61% for Beach sand.

Source: Municipal Comprehensive Landuse Plan & Zoning Ordinance (2000-2010)

Primelands
The primelands of the municipality have been categorized into three (3), namely: Agricultural, Forestry, and Miscellaneous areas.

 Source: Municipal Comprehensive Landuse Plan & Zoning Ordinance (2000-2010)

The agricultural areas is composed of about 82.09% or 3,860.54 hectares consisting the 2,918.0965 hectares of irrigated paddy riceland and 942.4440 hectares of coconut plantation. Forestry areas cover 414.7883 hectares, of which about 3.51% or 14.5787 hectares each compose the preservation forest and agro-forestry areas; while 19.61% or 81.3587 hectares are both mangrove trees and nipa plants categorized also as preservation areas. On the other hand, built-up areas is only about 7.05% of 331.5484 hectares of the total land area of the municipality.

Furthermore, based on the Pedo-ecological Zone Map of the town, around 90.13% or 4,238.6468 hectares of the total land area are under the warm lowland zone with a slope not greater than 8% and elevation of 100 meters above sea level. In the same context, about 8.35% or 392.6850 hectares are categorized as warm cool hilly land, usually found in barangay Adiangao; and miscellaneous areas composed the so-called Miscellaneous areas which is about 1.52% or with a land area of about 71.4828 hectares.

Meantime, the details on pedo-ecological zone based on the total land area can be found in the table below:

Source: Municipal Comprehensive Landuse Plan & Zoning Ordinance (2000-2010)

Land Use Opportunity
Based on the table below, the Land Use Opportunity Map of the municipality indicate that there are four classes of land use opportunity available which include 83.76% or 3,939.08 hectares for active agricultural areas; 5.18% or 243.61 hectares for rehabilitation areas; 2.17% or 102.05 for wetland areas; and 8.89% or 418.08 hectares for miscellaneous land usage. More specifically, the active agricultural areas though used for agricultural cultivation can be intended for complementary uses for human settlements and infrastructure development such as the construction of roads, bridges, and irrigation facilities. Meanwhile, the miscellaneous land areas may also include the built-up areas, river wash and other miscellaneous land usages.

 
Source: Municipal Comprehensive Landuse Plan & Zoning Ordinance (2000-2010)

Existing Land Use and Vegetation

The agricultural land areas composed about 88.52% of the total land area or 4,162.9315 hectares are planted with both palay and coconut trees. On the other hand, the wetland areas cover about 2.54% of the total land areas with 119.4515 hectares and 1.61% composed the sandy beaches with the land area of 75.7153 hectares; while about 7.33% or 344.7163 hectares consisted the built-up land areas. Details are shown in the table below:

Source: Municipal Comprehensive Landuse Plan & Zoning Ordinance (2000-2010)

Mineral Resources
The municipality has been endowed with a variety of mineral resources because of its diverse geological terrain which are partly located within the mountain ranges of Caramoan Peninsula. It has been known that the marble deposit in barangay Adiangao has an estimated volume of 71,772,912 metric tons; and it has been contained along the Maangas-Adiangao area and believed to be suitable for dimension stones.

There is noted also a considerable amount of deposit of "guano" inside the Adiangao Caves. On the other hand, high quality sand, gravels and boulders are abundantly found along the Rangas River traversing barangays Bagacay, Mampirao, Pugay, Calalahan, Tambangan and Calawit.

Volcanoes, Faults, and Earthquake Belt
The parallel location of the Bicol Volcanic Belt, or Philippine Fault Zone, to the Deep Philippine Trench practically contributed to the triangulated distribution of events with faults or volcanic abnormalities within the earthquake belts in the Bicol Region. It has been observed that the Bicol Volcanic Belt or Chain had a span of 240 km. from Camarines Norte in the North down to Sorsogon in the South with a total of 16 volcanoes separately spread over by about 24 km. apart and rested parallel along the 200 km. chain west of the Philippine Trench, which is the major source of earthquake in the region. The trench can be described as a long, narrow, and generally steep-sided very deep depression in the ocean floor. The axis of a trench marks, the position of a subduction zone where old oceanic lithospheric plates begin their descent into the earth's interior.

In 1987, a study was conducted which reveals that the Bicol Region particularly the location of San Jose is a part prone to earthquakes of intensify 5 from the above-cited source zones. Based on the frequency of volcanic eruptions that occurred in the region, there are three prominent volcanoes which are considered to be active, namely: Mt. Mayon, Mt. Bulusan, and Mt. Iriga (Asog). The latter is the nearest to the Municipality of San Jose.

Mount Iriga (Asog) has a peak of 1,143 meters above sea level and classified to be "stratovolcanoe" or it has a composite cone like that of Mt. Mayon and last record of eruption was in 1628 A.D. which eventually damned the Barit River but consequently created the Lake Buhi, the home of the smallest fish in the world with scientific name Pandaka pygmaea locally known as "tabios."

Demographics

The population projection was computed based on Geometric formula resulting to an average annual increase of 2.62%. Based on projections, the ten most populated barangays will be composed of Calalahan, Sabang, Salogon, Kinalansan, Dolo, Pugay, Tagas, Danlog, Tambangan, and Mampirao. As computed, the population projection by age group 22–35 years old registered the highest percentage share at 17.45% followed by 10-14 age cohort by 13.62%; 36–45 years old by 10.31%; 46–59 years old by 8.99%; and 7–9 years old by 8.85%.

Urban and rural population
In 2010, the municipality has a total household population of 8,029 of which 995 or 12.39% are in the urban while 7,034 or 87.61% are in the rural area. Of the total population of 38,523, about 12.26% or 4,722 are in the urban while majority which is about 87.74% or 33,801 are residing in the rural area. It has an average household size of 5.38 members per household while population density of 691 persons per square kilometers; urban with 3,083 persons and rural with 618 persons per square kilometers, respectively.

The ten densely populated barangays in the municipality include Sabang, Salogon, Calalahan, Kinalansan, Pugay, Dolo, Danlog, Adiangao, Tagas, and Mampirao in that order. The least populated barangays are San Vicente with 174 and Bahay with 316.

Source: Municipal Comprehensive Landuse Plan and Zoning Ordinance (2000-2010)

Age and gender structures
As of 2000, the household population of the municipality is composed of 16,695 or 51.35% with ages ranging from the legal age of 18 years and above; while less than half of its population or 48.65% composed the ages from under 1 to 17 years old. Of these, the Senior Citizens belong to the age group ranging from 60 and above which registered only about 6.43%. It can also be noted that of these household population, the age group 22-35 ranked first with 17.45%, followed by 10–14 with 13.62% and 36–45 with 10.31%. The same indication can be observed when based on the gender.

Source: Philippine Statistics Authority

Age structure
The range of age structure based on the total population which registered a total of 13,421 or 41.28% composed the age group 14 years old and below. On the other hand, 15–60 years and above has an aggregate total of 19,091 or 58.72%.

Gender structure and employment
In San Jose, there are more males than females. Males outnumbered the females by 0.82%. The computed gender ratio is 1.02% or equivalent to 102 males for every 100 females.

Economy

Majority of the households are engaged in farming, livestock raising (either backyard or commercial scale), or in fishing.  Some are employed in the government and private offices and others are engaged in business, trading or are self-employed.

A number of agro-related industries are present in San Jose, including welding shops, manufacturers of threshers, hand tractor, cart and plows, ice making and cold storage facilities, rural banks, and several rice mills.

Local products include:
 Rice is the major agricultural crop grown. Other crops planted in the municipality are coconut, root crops, vegetables and fruit-bearing trees.
 Various livestock raisers in all barangays. Numerous commercial raisers engaged in egg production. Produce are marketed in neighboring towns and Naga City.
 Bangus fry, fished in Lagonoy Gulf, is abundant and contributes to the revenues of the municipality.

Commerce
The commercial activities of the town are considered as small-scale with capitalization ranging from ₱50,000 to ₱5,000,000 only. About 60.75% of the 48 business establishments are general stores. Other commercial establishments include palay traders, cono ricemill, feed dealers, bakeries, welding shops, vulcanizing shops, photo studio, cable TV operators, gasoline stations, balcksmith, textile, rural bank and drugstores.

The municipal public market located at barangay Boclod has a total of 112 stalls with sizes ranging from 4x6 meters to 2.75 and 2.25 meters or an area per stall of 6.87 sq.m. to 24 sq.m. Some stalls have already been occupied/rented while others remained vacant.

The proximity of the town to Goa which is considered as the major trading center in the Partido District, and the low population level and the population growth rate of the municipality are considered to be the reasons for the underdevelopment of commerce and trade. Aside from the small market base, most of the consumers prefer to shop in Goa where a more complete array of goods and services can be found.

Government

List of former chief executives
Many prominent men took turns in holding the reins of the government from 1813 up to 1903 as Capitan Municipal, Juez de la Paz and Maestro Municipal, and their names and year(s) of service can be found printed at the walls of the lobby of the municipal building.

In the history of the local chief executives, the only woman elected as mayor was Salvacion R. Valer from 1960 to 1963.

Spanish period Capitan Municipal:

Jueces (judges):
 Don Braulio Obias
 Don Gregorio Patrocinio
 Don Manuel Imperial
 Don Ambrosio Reyes

Juez de sementera y de policia:
 Don Mariano Dizon

Maestros municipal:
 Don Juan Modino
 Dña Isidora Imperial
 Dña Marcelina Ortiz
 Dña Emilia Ortua

American regime Presidents:

Justice of peace:
 Gregorio Patrocinio
 Regino Palma
 Ambrosio Reyes
 Victoriano Azaña

Mayors:

Tourism

San Jose is endowed with natural tourism spots that, when fully developed, could possibly generate additional income for the municipality. This includes the numerous beaches with crystalline clear water along the coastline of Lagonoy Gulf and the Adiangao Cave at barangay Adiangao.

Heritage sites and buildings

The municipal building

Capitano Municipal Venancio Peñas initiated the building of the municipal hall during his term of office in 1877. His successors contributed to its completion, however, Typhoon "Uguis" hit the town in 1898 that caused the eventual destruction of the building. Several years after this calamity, the residence of Gregorio Patrocinio who was the Capital Municipal at that time was utilized as the municipal hall.

In the early days, the parochial house in the town was also utilized as the municipal tribunal. So that, before the construction of the municipal hall, the old convent could have been the government tribunal. In 1912, the already destroyed municipal hall was rehabilitated when Job Obias took office as the president of the town. The work never ceased until the zealous leader able to see the roof installed with galvanized iron sheets. Meantime, the balcony at the front, right above the main entrance of the municipal building was added during the presidency of Isaias Obias (1920-1922).

During the presidency of Jovito Dizon (1923-1925), the wooden stairs and floor was constructed, which until this time the same wooden stairs and floor exist where they were built. An engraved proof of this construction is seen on the Spanish stone wall of the municipal building. This engraved marker always greets everyone who takes the first step in climbing up the historic wooden stairs. It was told that San Joseños took the pride of owning the biggest municipal hall in the Bicol Region in 1953.

At present, the people of San Jose can take the pride and honor of having the only functional centuries-old municipal building still in its admirable strength and durability.

The Catholic Church

The site of the Catholic Church where it majestically stands until now, including all other church properties, was owned by Laurenciano Barcellano. It was chosen by Fr. Salvador Mendoza who considered the place as the most appropriate part to build the Church. The place was formerly called sitio "Cabayawasnan" which means guavas or guava orchard. In the 1880s, the place was known to have been grown with many guava trees particularly in the quadrangle which served as the spacious backyard of the old convent. The front part also served as the usual venue for religious and cultural activities such as the "cenaculo." It was told that once the wooden gates of the quadrangle were opened to the public, the folks or their children would usually take the chance of exploring the whole place even to the most secluded part of this area, of course without the watching eyes of the people in the convent.
The construction of the church started in 1818 under the strictest rule of the Cura Parrocco, Fr. Mendoza. It has a Romanesque architectural dimension with lime-plastered walls designed by a certain Felix Paete. The sand and lime used in its construction were taken from barangay Dolo, about 6 kilometers away.

The parishioners rendered the hard labor and experienced the extent of Polo Method in the construction of the church. At dusk time, the workers were already gathered around the designated place before the start of the work. According to old folks account, the workers were parading in the darkness of the night while carrying torches to light their way to reach the starting point of the work before dusk. They endured the rugged, thickly forested and muddy trail to make the very slow and difficult manual transport of the building materials and to make while of their hard labor, they would usually entertain themselves with songs and music as they carried the lime and sand from barangay Dolo to the site.

When the church was completed, there were donations received by the parish for its accessories. The belfry at the center of the church facade that holds the big bronze bell donated by Dalmacia Obias. The bell is considered to be the queen of the bells at the center of the belfry. People can find also two other smaller bells hanging at each side of the belfry beside the gigantic bronze bell. Accordingly, these three bells when rang send the intended message to all its parishioners, purportedly summoning them to come to church to attend mass. It would take a master ringer to harmoniously blend the sound of the bells with the queen bronze bell on the central command.

One can take notice of the church altar which is exactly the same altar that it had when the workers of the church had it constructed. The design of the retablo and the materials used are made from solid hard wood to give it an appropriate care of preservation. The present walnut color of paint applied to the retablo was made really intentional to conform with its original paint upon its construction, and the gold ornaments added are carefully designed to adapt to the centuries-old design that it was.

Meantime, the presidential chair where the parish priest sits is still the original chair used by the very first Cura. It was said to have undergone some minor repairs, but its main parts and appearance generally remained almost exactly the same as it was first used by Fr. Salvador Mendoza. Also the altar fence marks the separation of the priest's place from the parishioners. It then upholds the sacredness of the altar. It likewise undergone minors repairs but the original design and materials are preserved.

Christ the King monument
The gigantic monument of Christ the King (Cristo Rey) can be found at the church patio. It was donated by Primitiva Ortiz Obias and inaugurated on October 27, 1952. The monument was mounted on an elevated portal to give it a lordly treatment. It is facing east at the town center. Likewise, the base of the monument portal is also elevated like a low-raised floor. People love to stay by sitting on its floor, playing around, or simply enjoy the peace it offers.

The convent
The convent was built later than the church. Accordingly, before its construction, the first Cura could have stayed in an improvised parochial house made of caña and nipa. It also functioned as the municipal tribunal. During the Spanish time, the residence of the Cura was also the residence of the capitan municipal.

The old convent as still seen today is made of thick stone walls with wooden floors. It is very spacious and too big for one Cura. It also had many spacious rooms to accommodate visiting priests.

During World War II, this old convent was known to have served as the headquarters of the American Volunteer Soldiers while the pavement was used as the jail. In 1988, this old convent was converted into a preparatory seminary. In fact, its size made Archbishop Leonardo Z. Legaspi decide to covert it into a Pre-College Seminary purposely to accommodate the growing need of the Holy Rosary Minor Seminary for a formation house. In the same year, the old convent was made a preparatory seminary in consultation with then Parish Priest, Fr. Eutiquio Infante and it initially accepted seminarians on July 1, 1988, with Fr. Raul S. Pan as the first rector. In 1991, the name was changed to Holy Rosary Preparatory Seminary based on the provisions of the formation manual for the diocesan priestly life and ministry, "That Christ May Be Formed in Us."

Infrastructure

Transportation
The municipality has a total of 98.046 kilometers road length consisting of the National, Provincial, Municipal and Barangay roads. Approximately 6.730 kilometers or 6.864% of the total road length are classified as National roads, 24.830 kilometers or 25.3248% are provincial roads, 4.920 kilometers or 5.018% are Municipal roads and 61.566 kilometers or 62.793% are barangay roads with varying road conditions.

Based on the standard of 1.000 kilometers of road for every square kilometer of land area, the municipality requires 47 kilometers of road length. The existing road length in the area of 98.046 kilometers actually include all types of roads. Thus, this would only indicate that the existing roads are sufficient to facilitate the efficient transportation of agricultural and fishing products of the municipality.

There are 18 bridges existing in the area, the longest of which is located in barangay Pugay, a reinforced concrete deck girder (RCDA), one in Mampirao, Salogon, and the rest are Spanish-type bridges that are made of bricks and reinforced concrete, spillways and footbridges.

Water supply
The Partido water supply system of the Partido Development Administration (PWSS-PDA) Level III supplies the potable water. It has its water source from Lagonoy. There are 6 pipe connections from the poblacion area to the barangays of Camagong, Danlog, part of Boclod, Kinalansan, Manzana, Telegrafo, Dolo, and Sabang. The rest of the people are dependent from the artesian wells particularly in barangays along Lagonoy Gulf; as well as deepwells, shallow wells, and improved springs.

Power supply
As of 2010, the entire municipality has already been energized by the Camarines Sur IV Electric Cooperative (CASURECO IV). The latter supplies energy to approximately 3,260 residential connections as shown in the table below:

Communication
There are at least 3 entities that provide the communications  needs of the LGU. They are the Philippine Postal Corporation, Bayantel Group of Companies, Smart, and Globe Telecom Companies. The most common source of information, entertainment, and news is the broadcast media. All frequency signals of AM and FM radio stations based in Naga City, Legazpi City and Iriga City reached the area.

Sanitation
The table shows the household by type of sanitary toilet facilities being used:

Environmental management
The terrain of the municipality is characterized as level to gently rolling and sloping. About 91.96% of the municipal territory is characterized by terrain in general with a slope of 0-3% described as level to nearly level. Barangay Adiangao only which is located along the mountain ranges between the municipalities of Lagonoy and Presentacion has steep slopes ranging from 30 to 50 percent.

Approximately 92.14% of the municipal area are free from flooding hazards. Slight seasonal flooding, however, is observed in barangay Minoro and Dolo. Moderate seasonal flooding can be experienced some part of Dolo, Manzana, Kinalansan, Telegrafo, and Calalahan. The average flooding depth is these areas is 0.50 to 100 meters, which recedes either 2–5 days to a maximum of 7 days.

On Solid Waste Disposal, the two most common method used to garbage disposal are dumping in an open pit (not burned) and burning. Composting is also adopted while others are being served by the municipal garbage collectors. Majority of the households is equipped with sanitary toilets.

Healthcare
As of 2012, the recorded number of births in the municipality is 869 for a computed crude birth rate of 27.00 or about 27 births per 1,000 population.
 Fertility Rate - 173.97 or 124 births per 1000 female population
 Death Rate - 4.27% or 127 deaths for the entire year or an average of 4 deaths for every 1,000 population
 Infant Mortality Rate - 0.99% with 5 infant deaths for the whole year

Notably, about 66.14% of the total number of deaths for the year belonged to the age-group of 50 years old and over.

Leading Causes of Mortality
The table below shows the leading causes of mortality as of 2014 according to rank order:

In 2012, the following sickness/diseases/illnesses were listed to be the leading causes of death:
 Pneumonia
 Cardio-vascular disease
 Pulmonary tuberculosis
 Acute glomerulonephritis
 Cancer
 Severe Malnutrition
 Bronchial Asthma
 Diabetes Mellitus
 Severe Anemia
 Bleeding Peptic Ulcer
 Cirrhosis of the Liver

Parish priests (cura parroco)
The following were recorded parish priests of St. Joseph Parish: for the municipalities in the Third District of Camarines Sur.

Bibliography
 Alcina, Francisco as quoted by Felipe Landa Jocano. "Philippines at the Spanish Contact: An Essay in Ethnohistory" in Brown Heritage: Essays on Philippine Cultural Tradition and Literature. Antonio G. Manuud (ed.) Quezon City: Ateneo de Manila University Press, 1967.
 Demetrio, Francisco R. SJ. Encyclopedia of Philippine Folk Beliefs and Customs. Cagayan de Oro City: Xavier University, c1991.
 De Huerta, Fr. Felix. ESTADO geografico, topografico, estadistico, historic-religioso. Imprenta de los Amigos del Pais, a cargo de D.M. Sanchez. 1855 Manila.
 Dy-Liacco, Leonor R. Mga Osipon ni Tiyong Juan saka ni Tiyang Laling. Eva Zabaldica and Shiela Dy-Liacco (eds.), Hong Kong: Regal Printing Co., (no date)
 Dy-Liacco, Leonor R. "Folk Stories of Our Elders" in Sarong Dolot sa Satuyang Ina. Manila: J&R Printing Company, Inc., 1996
 Eugenio, Damiana L. Philippine Folktales: An Introduction. Asian Folklore Studies. Vol. 44, 1985
 Fansler, Dean S. Filipino Popular Tales. Hatboro, Penn: Folklore Associates, 1921, c1965.
 General, Luis Jr., Lydia SD. San Jose, and Rosalio Al. Parrone (eds.) Readings on Bikol Culture. Naga City: University of Nueva Caceres, 1972, p. 265
 Gerona, Danilo M. "Pre-Colonial Culture" From Epic to History: A Brief Introduction to Bicol History. Naga City, AMS Press, 1988.
 Gerona, Danilo M. The History of Education in Kabikolan (1578-1935) in Camarines by the Vicor River. Jose Fernando Obias, Danilo M. Gerona, and Fr. Danilo T. Imperial (eds.) Camarines Sur: Office of the Governor, 1999.
 Jagor, Feodor. (1870) "On the Natives of Naga, in Luzon, Philippine Islands", The Journal of the Ethnological Society of Luzon. 2(2).
 Malcolm W. Mintz. Bicol Dictionary. Honolulu: University of Hawaii Press, c1971.
 O'Brien, James J., SJ. The Historical and Cultural Heritage of the Bikol People, 1st edition, 1966; 2nd Edition, 1968, supplement, 1970; 3rd edition, 1993.
 Owen, Norman G. The Bikol Blend: Bikolanos and their History. Quezon City: New Day Publishers, c1998.
 Realubit, Maria Lilia F. Bikol Literary History. (No publication details)
 Rojas, Msgr. J. "History of Holy Rosary Preparatory Seminary". (Unpublished manuscript)

References

External links

 [ Philippine Standard Geographic Code]
Philippine Census Information
Official Site of the Province of Camarines Sur

 
Municipalities of Camarines Sur
Populated places established in 1813
1813 establishments in the Philippines